Mikosch, the Pride of the Company is a 1958 West German comedy film directed by Rudolf Schündler and starring Gunther Philipp, Walter Gross, and Kurt Großkurth. It was followed by a 1959 sequel Mikosch of the Secret Service.

Cast

References

Bibliography

External links 
 

1958 films
West German films
German historical comedy films
1950s historical comedy films
1950s German-language films
Films directed by Rudolf Schündler
Films set in Austria
Films set in the 1900s
Military humor in film
UFA GmbH films
1958 comedy films
1950s German films